Alexis Weidenbach (born 26 September 1996) is a Dominican football player who plays as a midfielder for German Regionalliga Südwest club TuS Rot-Weiß Koblenz and the Dominican Republic national team.

Early life
Weidenbach was born to a German father and a Dominican mother.

International career
Weidenbach made his international debut for the Dominican Republic in a 1–0 loss to Puerto Rico.

Career statistics

Club

Notes

International

References

1996 births
Living people
People from Santo Domingo Norte
Dominican Republic footballers
Association football midfielders
Dominican Republic international footballers
Dominican Republic people of German descent
Citizens of Germany through descent
German footballers
FC Rot-Weiß Koblenz players
Regionalliga players
German people of Dominican Republic descent
Sportspeople of Dominican Republic descent